is a Japanese badminton player who also play for the NTT East club. In 2012, his last year as a junior, he was instrumental in Japan's first ever mixed team title at the 2012 Asian Junior Badminton Championships. He and Akane Yamaguchi beat Pei Tianyi and Huang Yaqiong to begin the tie.  At the World Junior Championships the same year, he and Yamaguchi played the last match of the mixed team tie in the final against China. They lost their third game to Wang Yilyu and Chen Qingchen 22-24, giving China the title.

Achievements

BWF World Tour (3 runners-up)
The BWF World Tour, which was announced on 19 March 2017 and implemented in 2018, is a series of elite badminton tournaments sanctioned by the Badminton World Federation (BWF). The BWF World Tour is divided into levels of World Tour Finals, Super 1000, Super 750, Super 500, Super 300, and the BWF Tour Super 100.

Men's doubles

BWF International Challenge/Series (1 title) 
Men's doubles

 BWF International Challenge tournament
 BWF International Series tournament
 BWF Future Series tournament

References 

Living people
1994 births
Sportspeople from Saitama Prefecture
Japanese male badminton players
21st-century Japanese people